Matthew Hiltzik (born May 12, 1972) is an American attorney, public relations and communications consultant, and the founder of the strategic communications and consulting firm Hiltzik Strategies, which represents high-profile organizations and individuals.

Early life and education 
	
Hiltzik was raised in Teaneck, New Jersey. During his youth, he attended Yavneh Academy, where he was classmates with Naftali Bennett, Adam Szubin, and Jeremy Dauber. He graduated from the Ramaz School. He attended the Cornell University School of Industrial and Labor Relations and then the Fordham University School of Law. He is a member of the New York State Bar Association.

Career 
After law school, he worked as press secretary and deputy executive director of the New York State Democratic Committee under Judith Hope, the first woman to head a major political party in New York. While in that role, he worked on the 1998 campaigns of Chuck Schumer and Eliot Spitzer, and Hillary Clinton's Listening Tour in July 1999. In December 1999, Hiltzik joined Miramax as head of corporate communications. He became senior vice president of corporate communications and government relations, and was involved in public relations for Miramax Films, Miramax Books, Miramax TV, Talk magazine, philanthropic and political fundraising and crisis management.

In 2000, Hiltzik took a brief leave from Miramax to re-join Hillary Clinton's senatorial campaign as the director of Jewish relations. Hiltzik worked on outreach in the Reform, Conservative and Orthodox communities for Clinton's campaign, including making inroads with women in the Hasidic community. He met with leaders in New York's Jewish communities, including the Bobovers Hasidic section.

He then teamed up with the U.K.-based publicity company, Freud Communications, to start up their U.S. operations. He became Katie Couric's publicist and spokesman shortly before her move from NBC to CBS in 2006. She acknowledged his role in her career in her 2021 memoir Going There.

Hiltzik went out on his own in early 2008 to start up Hiltzik Strategies. He maintained his political roots advising Jose Antonio Vargas's DefineAmerican campaign to address immigration policy in the United States and pass the DREAM Act, and Thomas DiNapoli in his successful bid for New York State Comptroller. Hiltzik served on New York City Mayor Bill DeBlasio's 2014 Inaugural Committee. He also advised Reshma Saujani, founder of Girls Who Code, in her primary against Rep. Carolyn Maloney. Hiltzik advised political strategist Lis Smith on crisis management, and encouraged her to write a book about her experiences, which was published as Any Give Tuesday in 2022.

In 2017, Hiltzik was listed on Sports Business Journals "Power Players" list. In August 2021, Business Insider ranked Hiltzik as one of the top public relations people in crisis management, citing his experience working with high-profile clients like Brad Pitt, Eric Schmidt, Katie Couric and Kelly Ripa.

Hiltzik and his team were engaged by attorneys to support litigation in the Johnny Depp trial, and Hiltzik played a primary role in rehabilitating the actor's image during his successful defamation case against Amber Heard. Hiltzik kept a low profile in the media in the aftermath of the trial, while working to encourage support for Depp and revitalize his career.

Film and print media 
He was executive producer of the documentary films Documented, The Barn, the award-winning Paper Clips and Holy Land Hardball; and co-produced the documentary Connected. He is also a contributor to the Jewish magazine Tablet.

Recognition and board memberships 
In 2012 Hiltzik was honored by the New York Board of Rabbis for his work in the Jewish community.

In July 2015, he  was the first public relations professional to be named to the board of directors of the New York City Economic Development Corporation, a not-for-profit corporation that promotes economic growth throughout New York City.

Hiltzik sits on the Board of the Ghetto Film School. In the summer of 2020, during the coronavirus pandemic, Hiltzik suggested that the school's film competition focus on the subject of connection during isolation and lockdown.

Personal life 
Hiltzik lives in New York City. He is married to wife Dana and has three children.

References

External links 

 

1972 births
Living people
20th-century American Jews
Cornell University School of Industrial and Labor Relations alumni
Fordham University School of Law alumni
People from Teaneck, New Jersey
Ramaz School alumni
21st-century American Jews
American businesspeople in mass media
American consultants
American consulting businesspeople
Jewish American attorneys
21st-century American lawyers
American public relations people
American publicists
American political consultants
American press secretaries
Political campaign staff
New York (state) Democrats
American nonprofit businesspeople